Raziabad (also Romanized as Raẕīābād) is a village in Sharqi Rural District, in the Central District of Ardabil County, Ardabil Province, Iran. At the 2006 census, its population was 272, in 62 families.

References 

Towns and villages in Ardabil County